The Hungarian Settlement School, now home to the Hungarian Settlement Museum, is a historic school building located at 27455 LA 43 in Albany, Louisiana.

Originally built in Springfield in c.1910, the structure was moved in 1928 to the nearby Hungarian Settlement where it served as the principal school until its closure in 1943. After being abandoned for long time, the Hungarian Settlement Historical Society obtained a long-term lease on the property in 2000 and began a complete restoration of the building for the purpose of turning it into a museum.

The building was listed on the National Register of Historic Places on August 2, 2001.

The Hungarian Settlement Museum grand opening was celebrated on September 27, 2017.

See also
 National Register of Historic Places listings in Livingston Parish, Louisiana

References

External links
Hungarian Settlement Museum webpage
Hungarian Settlement School

School buildings on the National Register of Historic Places in Louisiana
School buildings completed in 1910
Livingston Parish, Louisiana
National Register of Historic Places in Livingston Parish, Louisiana